Jesse Garon may refer to:

Jesse Garon (disc jockey), Olean, New York radio host
Jesse Garon And The Desperadoes, indie-pop group from Edinburgh, Scotland
Jesse Garon (musician), French musician